Autoracing Club Bratislava, also known as ARC Bratislava, is an auto racing team based in Slovakia. The team is led by Miro Konôpka, who has been driving for the team since its inception. ARC Bratislava are currently known for competing in the Asian Le Mans Series and also the FIA World Endurance Championship, where they lasted for two seasons in the LMP2 Pro-Am class, joining the series in 2021. The team has competed in various FIA, ACO or SRO-sanctioned championships throughout its existence, using various prototypes or GT cars. ARC Bratislava also compete in the local ESET V4 Cup, where Konôpka is a three-time overall champion. The team has been active on the esports scene as well, recently joining the new Le Mans Virtual Series.

History
The team was formed in 1997 by Miro Konôpka and Dušan Vysloužil to boost their racing efforts. After initially competing in local series, the team has since moved onto international competition. The team has competed in various forms of motorsport like hill climb racing, rallying but most importantly circuit racing. Their first notable international entry was the 2003 Porsche Supercup. In 2005, the team entered the FIA GT Championship, staying there until the 2009 season. The team has also competed twice in the American Le Mans Series, entering the 2007 and 2008 editions of 12 Hours of Sebring, as well as making a one-off appearance in the 2009 Le Mans Series.

24H Series

ARC Bratislava are semi-regular visitors to the Dubai 24 Hour event which preceded and is now part of the 24H Series. In the inaugural edition of the event, the team fielded a Porsche GT3 in the A6 class with the lineup of Konôpka, Gene Sigal, Matthew Alhadeff and Jirko Malchárek. The team entered as AC Bratislava finished third overall and second in their respective class. The team, now entered under its full name Autoracing Club Bratislava, returned with the same car and a slightly different lineup of Konôpka, Malchárek and two new drivers in Jim Michaelian and Mauro Casadei for the 2007 edition. This time around, the team finished fifth overall and fourth in the A6 class.

The team was also part of the inaugural season of the 24H Series in 2008. After completing just 53 laps, the team was classified in a very low 85th place in the 2008 Dubai 24 Hour. Konôpka and Michaelian were joined by German drivers Jürgen Bender and Martin Dechent for the event. In 2008 and 2010, Konôpka's team had also contested the 12-hour endurance race held at the Hungaroring, finishing fourth overall in the latter edition. For 2009, the team's involvement was reduced to just the Dubai race where the lineup of Konôpka, Oliver Morley, Sean Edwards and Richard Cvörnjek finished fourth overall and earned another class podium with a third place. In their fifth consecutive Dubai appearance in 2010 with an unchanged lineup from the previous year, the team could only manage 87 laps, which resulted in 72nd place overall and also the last place in the A6 class.

ARC Bratislava missed the 2011 Dubai 24 Hour because Konôpka contested it with a different team. Konôpka returned with his own team for the 2012 edition alongside Teo Myszkowski, Andrzej Lewandowski and Marco Schelp. In another compromised outing, the team finished 53rd overall and 24th in the A6 class. In addition to Dubai, the team entered the 2012 24 Hours of Barcelona. It was a very successful race as the team finished third overall and more importantly first in their class. The team fielded a Porsche 997 Cup with a five-driver lineup consisting of Konôpka, his son Maťo Konôpka, Ivo Breukers, Wolf Nathan and Jaap van Lagen.

After a two-year hiatus, ARC Bratislava returned to 24H Series by competing in two rounds of the 2015 season. Konôpka did not miss the 2013, 2014 and 2015 editions of Dubai however, as well as the second and third round of the 2015 season, once again racing individually for other teams. ARC Bratislava then entered the fourth and fifth round of the season, which were held at Circuit Paul Ricard and Barcelona respectively. The team once again won in its class in Barcelona. Now part of the SP2 class, the team entered an all-Slovak lineup of the two Konôpkas, Zdeno Mikuláško and Miro Horňák.

After multiple seasons out of the series, ARC Bratislava once again returned in 2020, this time entering the 12 Hours of Monza. After years of using Porsche machinery, the team has now switched to Lamborghini Huracán Super Trofeo, which was also in use for their activities in the Lamborghini Super Trofeo Europe series. The two Konôpkas were joined by Maťo Homola and this trio ended up winning the GTX class with a sixth place overall. This win also meant a gold trophy in the GTX Teams' Europe Series. The team failed to finish their 2021 return to Dubai after completing 441 laps, which was still enough for third place in the GTX class. The lineup consisted of Miro and Maťo Konôpka, Justas Jonušis, Thomas Padovani and Zdeno Mikuláško.

For the 2022 season, ARC Bratislava have registered for the Dubai 24 Hour and the following non-championship six-hour race in Abu Dhabi, bringing their Lamborghini Huracán GT3 to be driven by the lineup of Miro and Maťo Konôpka, Zdeno Mikuláško, the returning Andrzej Lewandowski and Tom Jackson, who previously drove for the team in the 2021 FIA World Endurance Championship. The team was part of the GT3-Am class for Dubai, finishing fifth out of nine entries while completing 572 laps which was enough for 18th place in overall standings. Only the Konôpkas then took part in the Abu Dhabi race despite Lewandowski also being on the initial entry list. In the joint GT3 class for this event, ARC Bratislava qualified and also finished in sixth position, which was also their overall result. ARC Bratislava took part in one more 24H Series event of 2022, making an appearance at the inaugural 12 Hours of Kuwait. Miro and Maťo Konôpka were once again joined by Zdeno Mikuláško. The team suffered multiple punctures in the race, the first one making them drop from overall lead just few minutes into the race. They were the final team to be classified, completing 182 laps which put them in 20th place. Mikuláško also posted the fastest lap of the race in his final stint.

Miro Konôpka along with Andrzej Lewandowski then returned for the 2023 6 Hours of Abu Dhabi. As the sole competitor in GT3 Am, the team won their class by default, while also finishing tenth overall.

Blancpain Endurance Series

In addition to the 24H Series, the team has started appearing in the Blancpain Endurance Series. 2012 was their debut season where they entered the Pro-Am Cup. ARC's first Blancpain season ended at the 24 Hours of Spa, where the Porsche 997 GT3-R driven by the quartet of Konôpka, Mikuláško, Stefano Crotti and Christoff Corten failed to finish the race after completing 305 laps. The team also failed to score a point in the whole season. In 2013, ARC Bratislava contested the full season. Konôpka along with Ahmad Al Harthy drove the Porsche in all five races, with Ján Raška and Marco Schelp joining them for Spa. The team was now moved to the Gentlemen Trophy. This significantly improved the team's results as it finished sixth in the class with 35 points and one class win from Silverstone.

After missing two seasons, the team was back for the 2016 season in a championship now known as the Blancpain GT Series Endurance Cup. Konôpka along with Lewandowski and Myszkowski (joined by Mikuláško as a fourth driver for Spa) competed in the Am Cup with the Lamborghini Huracán GT3. The team finished fourth in the class with 67 points and two podiums. ARC Bratislava most recently competed in the 2018 season where they only took part in the season opener at Monza as part of the Pro Am class, this time using the Mercedes-AMG GT3. The trio of Konôpka, Lewandowski and Kang Ling finished 34th overall.

Asian Le Mans Series
ARC Bratislava have been one of the mainstay teams of the series since the 2015–16 season. As of the 2023 season, the team is part of the LMP2 class.

GT class (2015–2016)
ARC's intention to enter the Asian Le Mans Series was announced in September 2015. The team chose to compete in the GT class with the Audi R8 LMS Ultra despite concerns over the balance of performance. Konôpka's initial partner for the first round was announced to be Pierre Kaffer before Fairuz Fauzy could step in for the following round. Fauzy did not complete the season either however, as Afiq Yazid replaced him for the final round. The team finished seventh in the GT Teams Championship with 28 points. The team's best result was a fourth place from the opening round in Fuji.

LMP3 class (2016–2017; 2019; 2021)
In early 2016, the ARC bought a used Ginetta-Juno P3-15. After an unsuccessful registration for the 2016 European Le Mans Series, it was then decided that ARC Bratislava would use this car in the 2016–17 Asian Le Mans season instead as part of the LMP3 class. The team eventually entered two cars for the 2016–17 season. Konôpka, Darren Burke, Mike Simpson, Konstantīns Calko and Neale Muston were the five drivers to alternate between the two cars over the season. Car no. 4 enjoyed more success as it secured Ginetta's first Asian Le Mans Series podium in Fuji. In the next race at Buriram, the same car won its class. The car finished second overall in the LMP3 Teams Championship with these two podiums and 63 points. Car no. 7 finished fifth with 46 points and one second place from Buriram, where ARC Bratislava scored their first 1-2 finish. ARC Bratislava then made a one-off return to the LMP3 class with their Ginetta at the 2019 4 Hours of Sepang. Simpson and Muston finished fifteenth overall and ninth in the class.

After three seasons in LMP2, ARC Bratislava have moved back to LMP3 for the 2021 season. Their entry meant a competition debut for the Ginetta G61-LT-P3. This time around, Konôpka was joined by Tom Cloet and Ginetta's factory driver Charlie Robertson. After a complicated season with an unproven car, the team could only manage to finish ninth in the class with 14 points.

LMP2 class (2017–2020; 2022–present)

For the 2017–18 season, the team has once again moved to a higher category, this time to LMP2 which is highest category in the series. Ligier JS P2 was chosen as the car to contest the season. Konôpka retained Calko and Breukers who drove for the team in the previous season. Breukers was however replaced by Gustavo Yacamán in the middle of the season. In their LMP2 debut, the team finished third in the LMP2 Teams Championship with 51 points and one podium. In the 2018–19 season, ARC Bratislava were one of three teams to compete in the new LMP2 Am subclass. Burke and Ling returned to the team to replace Calko and Yacamán. The ARC managed to win this class by getting three wins and one second-place finish in it. In the complete LMP2 class, they once again finished third after once again scoring 51 points. The following 2019–20 season was interrupted by the COVID-19 pandemic, which reduced the number of entries. Konôpka's team withdrew before the third round in Sepang.

After an underwhelming single season return to LMP3, ARC Bratislava decided to once again join LMP2 Am in 2022, this time with the Ligier JS P217 as the car remained unused after ARC moving to the Oreca 07 in the World Endurance Championship. Miro Konôpka would be joined by the returning Neale Muston and also John Corbett to create an all-bronze amateur lineup. After two seasons as a separate class, the LMP2 Am category however once again became a subclass for the overall LMP2 grid after only four teams registered for the full season. ARC Bratislava's best result of the season came in the final race in Abu Dhabi where they finished ahead of High Class Racing. The team scored 51 points in the overall LMP2 category (achieving this feat for the third time) and 63 points in LMP2 Am, finishing last in both championships, which still resulted in a third-place finish in LMP2 Am.

For 2023, the team would finally be able to enter their sole Oreca 07, which was previously used for the World Endurance Championship. With LMP2 Am no longer being a category, Miro Konôpka opted to bring two young professional drivers in Nico Pino and László Tóth, the latter of which would also be making his endurance racing debut.

FIA World Endurance Championship
ARC Bratislava have contested the FIA World Endurance Championship exclusively in the LMP2 class with them becoming a full-time entry in 2021 in the LMP2 Pro-Am subclass. The team contested two full seasons and only missed one race due to issues with logictics. For 2023, ARC Bratislava opted not to return as LMP2 Pro-Am would be phased out due to the expanding Hypercar field.

24 Hours of Le Mans entries

ARC Bratislava first appeared on a provisional entry for the 2017 24 Hours of Le Mans in February 2017 and the team was listed with an Oreca 07. Konôpka however then claimed that ARC were planning to use the Ligier JS P217 instead. Calko and Rik Breukers were later announced as Konôpka's teammates. ARC Bratislava finished 45th overall in their debut after completing 314 laps. This was enough for 19th place in the LMP2 class. The team then secured an automatic entry for the 2019 edition of the race by winning the LMP2 Am trophy in the 2018–19 Asian Le Mans Series. For ARC's second Le Mans attempt, Konôpka surrounded himself with two Le Mans rookies in Henning Enqvist and Konstantin Tereshchenko. After multiple accidents, the team retired from the race after completing 160 laps.

2021 season
Konôpka, a bronze-rated driver, secured a full-time entry for his team in WEC after a new LMP2 Pro-Am subclass was created, which mandates a bronze-rated driver in the teams' lineups and thus creating more opportunity for such drivers and teams in the series by giving them a separate championship in addition to being included in overall LMP2 standings. Despite its general uncompetitiveness, ARC Bratislava started the season with the Ligier JS P217 as the only team on the grid. Oliver Webb was signed to the team as its main driver, having experience in the series from LMP1. Webb could not attend the season opener in Spa however, which prompted Konôpka to use Darren Burke instead. The final seat was given to another British driver in Tom Jackson. The team did not manage to start in its debut race due to an oil leak. Webb then made his debut for the team in the 8 Hours of Portimão. The team managed to finish the race this time, however it was not without issues. A spin for Konôpka caused a safety car period at the start of the sixth hour. The car was then recovered and the team went on to finish 29th overall as the second to last car to be classified in the race and also the last LMP2.

Before the 6 Hours of Monza, it was announced that the team would switch to the Oreca 07 chassis for Le Mans and would finish the season with it. For Monza, there was another change in the driver lineup as Maťo Konôpka replaced Tom Jackson. In an uneventful race for the team, ARC Bratislava finished 14th, which was once again the last place for a classified LMP2 car. The subsequent debut for the Oreca at Le Mans was not without issues either as the car had to be pulled into the pits at one point due to an incident involving Miro Konôpka being spun. Further issues then involved Maťo Konôpka damaging the rear of the car after spinning during the night portion of the race under wet conditions. The team however managed to finish the race in a respectable 24th position overall and a 15th place in the expanded LMP2 class. Out of those within the championship, ARC Bratislava finished ninth overall (their best championship result to date) and fifth in Pro-Am. The performance of the Oreca proved to be an upgrade over the Ligier as Webb posted the third fastest time of the Pro-Am subclass in the race.

For the final two races in Bahrain, the team made further changes to its line-up. The third seat, which was occupied by Maťo Konôpka in the two previous races, was now given to Kush Maini for the six-hour race and Nelson Panciatici for the eight-hour race. The six-hour race saw ARC Bratislava finish fourth in Pro-Am, despite having technical issues due to which the only finished 21st overall. In a last-minute unscheduled change, Olli Caldwell replaced Webb for the final race of the season. The new squad could not match the class result from the previous race, finishing fifth in Pro-Am and eleventh in the complete LMP2 class this time around. ARC Bratislava scored the least amount of total points in the LMP2 field. Miro Konôpka was also the only driver in the team to have contested all six races. Konôpka has expressed interest to continue in the series for the 2022 season.

2022 season

ARC Bratislava once again entered the LMP2 Pro-Am subclass for 2022, competing directly with only three other cars within the full LMP2 class that got expanded to fifteen entries. Before G-Drive Racing withdrew due to the ongoing Russo-Ukrainian War, only three teams were listed in Pro-Am. Algarve Pro Racing, who also provide technical support for ARC Bratislava and were set to do the same for G-Drive, instead joined the series under their own branding and moved to LMP2 Pro-Am. Mathias Beche and Tijmen van der Helm were listed alongside Miro Konôpka for the opening round in Sebring. Beche was however set to miss the 24 Hours of Le Mans as an ARC Bratislava driver as he is contracted to TDS Racing x Vaillante for the event.

ARC Bratislava have opened the season with a thirteenth place in LMP2 (fourth in Pro-Am), finishing sixteenth overall. For the 6 Hours of Spa-Francorchamps, Bent Viscaal joined the team after an early departure for Beche. Viscaal did not get to race however, as Konôpka crashed during his stint, forcing the team to retire from the race after completing 25 laps. Another driver change was scheduled for Le Mans, with Tristan Vautier being set to make his Le Mans debut after van der Helm also moving to the TDS Racing squad for the event. Maťo Konôpka also took part in the event and was available for test day as a fourth driver, but eventually did not take part in it as Vautier arrived in time from his previous racing commitments in IMSA. The team had a great start to the race, enjoying a lead in the Pro-Am category before being forced to replace a punctured radiator and losing multiple laps in the pits by doing so. Despite having no other issues, the team could only finish 26th overall, 21st in LMP2 and sixth in Pro-Am. This was therefore a worse result for ARC Bratislava compared to the previous edition of the race, despite completing 18 more laps. As part of the WEC, the team took 30 points for a third-place finish in Pro-Am, as they beat Ultimate who after numerous issues only finished 48th overall. The team is still yet to a score a point in the overall LMP2 category, which no longer awards points for just completing the race even outside the top 10.

On 24 June 2022, ARC Bratislava announced that they will not take part in the 6 Hours of Fuji due to very tight logistical deadlines after the 6 Hours of Monza. For Monza, both van der Helm and Beche are scheduled to return to the team and reform the original driver lineup. Beche almost led the team to its first pole, finishing second in overall LMP2 qualifying classification. The team however fell down to eleventh in LMP2, once again finishing last in Pro-Am. Despite Peugeot returning to WEC, thus increasing the grid in the top class, ARC Bratislava finished fourteenth overall in what was their best season result to date.

Ahead of the 8 Hours of Bahrain, Miro Konôpka stated that ARC Bratislava would not return to the series next year. Miro would be joined by Beche and Richard Bradley for the team's final appearance. The team could only finish 22th overall behind the GTE Pro field due to extensive damage repairs. This meant thirteenth place in LMP2 and fourth place in Pro-Am. ARC Bratislava scored 78 points in Pro-Am over the season (and none in LMP2 overall), finishing last in both categories.

Results

FIA GT Championship results
(key) (results in bold indicate pole position)

Asian Le Mans Series results
(key) (results in bold indicate pole position)

FIA World Endurance Championship results
(key) (results in bold indicate pole position)

24 Hours of Le Mans results

Le Mans Virtual Series results
(key) (results in bold indicate pole position)

Prototype Cup Germany results
(key) (results in bold indicate pole position)

Timeline

Notes
  – Dubai 24 Hour only.
  – Selected races only.
  – 24 Hours of Le Mans only.
  – The team was entered under the name Team Slovakia.
  – 12 Hours of Sebring only.

References

24 Hours of Le Mans teams
Blancpain Endurance Series teams
European Le Mans Series teams
FIA GT Championship teams
International GT Open teams
FIA World Endurance Championship teams
Auto racing teams established in 1997
Sport in Bratislava